Patuari is a village in the borough of Sakhigopal on the River Bhargavi in Puri district of the Indian state of Odisha. It is located about 17 km north from district headquarters Puri and 42 km from state capital Bhubaneswar.

Pincodes near Patuari:
752012 (Chandanpur), 752014 (Sakhigopal), 752046 (Satasankha) Main are occupied by the tenant no.1, is the, Regional Coconut Research Farm, (Established in the, year- 1955 consisting of about 120 acres ), Government of Odisha, and the 2nd, tenant is, Chandra Madhab Misra,  Ex.M L A, Satyabadi, Founder President of ORRISA M / Small scale Industries of Odisha, a Social Activist and a Famous Agro. Industrialist of Odisha ' s own Agricultural Farm :

Demographics
Oriya is the local language here; Hindi and English are widely spoken and understood.

Transport
By air
Bhubaneswar Airport is about 40 km from Patuari; the airport has frequent flight connection with Delhi, Mumbai, Kolkata, Hyderabad and Chennai.

By road
National Highway 203 from Bhubaneshwar to Puri connects the village. It is about 40 minutes drive from Bhubaneshwar and 20 minutes drive from Puri.

By rail
SakhiGopal Railway Station, Birpurusothampr Railway Station are the very nearby railway stations to Patuari. However, Puri railway station is major railway station 17  from Patuari.

External links
 

Villages in Puri district